Iton watsonii is a butterfly in the family Hesperiidae. It was described by Lionel de Nicéville in 1890. It is endemic to Burma in the Indomalayan realm.

References

External links

Iton at Markku Savela's Lepidoptera and Some Other Life Forms

Hesperiidae genera
Butterflies described in 1890